"Heartstopper" is a song by Emilíana Torrini, released as the third promotional release from her Fisherman's Woman album in 2005. It was released as a 7" vinyl single, enhanced CD single and promo CD single. It reached number 126 on the UK Singles Chart.

Track listing
 "Heartstopper" (radiofied version)
 "Thinking Out Loud" (extended horn section version)
 "Heartstopper" (stop Hearting mix by múm)
 "Heartstopper" (album version)
 "Heartstopper" (video)

References

Emilíana Torrini songs
2005 singles
2004 songs
Songs written by Emilíana Torrini
Songs written by Dan Carey (record producer)
Rough Trade Records singles